AnimeJapan is a Japanese anime consumer show held for the first time at the Tokyo Big Sight exhibition center in Tokyo, in March 2014. It was created from the merger of the Tokyo International Anime Fair with the Anime Contents Expo.

It is organized by the AnimeJapan Executive Committee with support from The Association of Japanese Animations and The Association of Manga Publishers. The 2020 AnimeJapan event was cancelled due to the COVID-19 pandemic and the 2021 event took place online, with the event returning to Tokyo Big Sight in 2022.

AnimeJapan Executive Committee
The AnimeJapan Executive Committee is made up of the following 19 companies.
Animate
Aniplex
Bandai Namco Arts
Frontier Works
Kadokawa Corporation
King Records
Marvelous
NBCUniversal Entertainment Japan
Nihon Ad Systems
Nippon Animation
Pierrot
Pony Canyon
Production I.G
Satelight
Shogakukan-Shueisha Productions
Sunrise
Tezuka Productions
Toei Animation
TMS Entertainment

Events history

References

External links

2014 establishments in Japan
Recurring events established in 2014
Anime conventions in Japan
Annual events in Japan
Culture in Tokyo
Trade fairs in Japan
Tourist attractions in Tokyo
Book fairs in Japan